Nazım Aslangil (born 10 January 1911, date of death unknown) was a Turkish alpine skier. He competed in the men's combined event at the 1936 Winter Olympics.

References

1911 births
Year of death missing
Turkish male alpine skiers
Olympic alpine skiers of Turkey
Alpine skiers at the 1936 Winter Olympics
Place of birth missing
20th-century Turkish people